In mathematics, structural Ramsey theory is a categorical generalisation of Ramsey theory, rooted in the idea that many important results of Ramsey theory have "similar" logical structure. The key observation is noting that these Ramsey-type theorems can be expressed as the assertion that a certain category (or class of finite structures) has the Ramsey property (defined below).

Structural Ramsey theory began in the 1970s with the work of Nešetřil and Rödl, and is intimately connected to Fraïssé theory. It received some renewed interest in the mid-2000s due to the discovery of the Kechris–Pestov–Todorčević correspondence, which connected structural Ramsey theory to topological dynamics.

History 
 is given credit for inventing the idea of a Ramsey property in the early 70s, and the first publication of this idea appears to be Graham, Leeb and Rothschild's 1972 paper on the subject. Key development of these ideas was done by Nešetřil and Rödl in their series of 1977 and 1983 papers, including the famous Nešetřil–Rödl theorem. More recently, Mašulović and Solecki have done some pioneering work in the field.

Motivation 

This article will use the set theory convention that each natural number  can be considered as the set of all natural numbers less than it: i.e. .

Here are some of the classic results of Ramsey theory:

 Graham–Rothschild theorem: fix a finite alphabet .

What types of structures are allowed depends on the theorem in question, and this turns out to be virtually the only difference between them. This idea of a "Ramsey-type theorem" leads itself to the more precise notion of the Ramsey property (below).

The Ramsey property 

is -monochromatic.

Often,  is taken to be a class of finite -structures over some fixed language , with embeddings as morphisms. This may lend itself more intuitively to the earlier idea of a "Ramsey-type theorem".

There is also a notion of a dual Ramsey property;  has the dual Ramsey property if its dual category  has the Ramsey property as above.

Examples 

 Ramsey's theorem: the class of all finite chains, with order-preserving maps as morphisms, has the Ramsey property.
Hales–Jewett theorem: let  be a finite alphabet, and for each , let  be a set of  variables.
Graham–Rothschild theorem: the category  defined above has the dual Ramsey property.

The Kechris–Pestov–Todorčević correspondence 
In 2005, Kechris, Pestov and Todorčević discovered the following correspondence (hereafter called the KPT correspondence) between structural Ramsey theory, Fraïssé theory, and ideas from topological dynamics.

Let  be a topological group.

The following theorem illustrates the KPT correspondence:Theorem (KPT). For a Fraïssé structure , the following are equivalent:

 The class  has the Ramsey property.

See also 

 Ramsey theory
 Fraïssé's theorem
 Age (model theory)

References 

Category theory
Ramsey theory
Model theory